Olga Nazarova is a Russian 400 metre runner.

Olga Nazarova may also refer to:

Olga Nazarova (biathlete) (born 1977), Russian-born Belarusian biathlete
Olga Nazarova (hurdler) (born 1962), Russian hurdler